Forest tracks or forest roads are roads or tracks intended to carry motorised vehicles or horse-drawn wagons being used mainly or exclusively for forestry purposes, such as conservation or logging. Forest tracks may be open to ramblers or mountain bikers depending on local rules.

Description 

Forest roads may be tarmacked, gravelled or metalled (using hard core) and often have restrictions on use. In many regions the establishment of forest roads is not only subject to approval under forest management law, but also conservation law.

In riparian forest and other especially important conservation areas, forest roads and tracks are generally signed as being out of bounds and/or closed off with barriers.

In mountainous regions the situation is more complex. On the one hand, forest roads on steep mountainsides must be wider than on the plains in order to enable vehicles to safely negotiate hairpin bends. On the other hand, the widening of old tracks runs the risk of heavier erosion or landslides.

Classification 

Forest roads may be subdivided into various classes according to their capacity. For example, in Germany, the key of topographic maps distinguishes between are metalled roadways (Befestigte Fahrwegen), roadways (Fahrwegen), forest tracks (Waldwegen) and footpaths (Fußwegen), the latter not being suitable for forest vehicles.

See also 
Agricultural road

Further reading 
 Peter Dietz, Wolfgang Knigge, Hans Löffler: Walderschließung. Ein Lehrbuch für Studium und Praxis unter besonderer Berücksichtigung des Waldwegebaus. Parey, Hamburg und Berlin 1984, 426 pp., 
 Swen Hentschel, Funktionenbezogene Optimierung der Walderschließung im Göttinger Stadtwald unter Einsatz Geographischer Informationssysteme, especially Kap. 3.4 - Herleiten eines bedarfsorientierten Erschließungsnetzes, Diss. Göttingen, July 1999
 Verwaltungsgericht Köln Urteil Az. 14 K 5008/07 (PDF; 38 kB), Begründungsteil zur Waldwegedefinition, Cologne, 2 December 2008

References

External links 

 Podcast Forest roads - access to our forests at www.forstcast.net

Road
Types of roads